Wharetutu Te Aroha Stirling (28 January 1924 – 31 March 1993) was a notable New Zealand tribal leader and conservationist. Of Māori descent, she identified with the Ngāi Tahu iwi. She was a major participant in the Ngāi Tahu Treaty of Waitangi claim and settlement process. She was born in Lyttelton, North Canterbury, New Zealand in 1924.

Stirling was the granddaughter of Hariata Pitini-Morera. Her brother was tribal elder Bill Solomon.

Stirling's written works were collected and published.

References

1924 births
1993 deaths
New Zealand conservationists
People from Lyttelton, New Zealand
Ngāi Tahu people